The 1956 Republican National Convention was held by the Republican Party of the United States at the Cow Palace in San Francisco, California,  from August 20 to August 23, 1956. U.S. Senator William F. Knowland was temporary chairman and former speaker of the House Joseph W. Martin Jr. served as permanent chairman. It renominated President Dwight D. Eisenhower and Vice President Richard M. Nixon as the party's candidates for the 1956 presidential election.

On August 23, 1956, singer Nat King Cole spoke at the Republican Convention.

The 1956 Republican convention was held after that year's Democratic National Convention. This was unusual, as since 1864, in every election but 1888, Democrats had held their convention second. It has become an informal tradition that the party holding the White House (which, accordingly, in 1956 had been the Republican Party) hosts their convention second, but it is unclear when this tradition began (Democrats had held the White House and held their conventions second between 1936 and 1952, but it is unclear whether they scheduled their conventions second in these years because of their White House incumbency, or whether they scheduled them second because it was traditional that Democratic National Conventions had been held after the Republican National Convention).

The 'Joe Smith incident' 
President Eisenhower was unanimously re-nominated by the Republican delegates for President of the United States. Such was expected for Vice President Nixon as well, until one renegade delegate, former Democratic Congressman and perennial candidate Terry Carpenter, decided to place in nomination for Vice President a man named Joe Smith, from Carpenter's own Terrytown, Nebraska. When asked who Joe Smith was at the 1956 convention, Carpenter mysteriously replied, "Oh, he is a symbol of an open convention, in that sense of the word." It was eventually revealed that there was no such man, and that his nomination was a protest against the perceived political theater of the closed 1956 Republican National Convention. He ultimately did cast his one dissenting vote for Vice President for Joe Smith.

See also
History of the United States Republican Party
List of Republican National Conventions
1956 Democratic National Convention
1956 United States presidential election

References

External links
 Republican Party platform of 1956 at The American Presidency Project
 Eisenhower nomination acceptance speech for President at RNC (transcript) at The American Presidency Project
http://politicalgraveyard.com
Universal newsreel footage of the convention
Universal newsreel footage of the convention
Video of Nixon nomination acceptance speech for Vice President and Eisenhower nomination acceptance speech for President at RNC from C-SPAN (via YouTube) 
Audio of Eisenhower nomination acceptance speech for President at RNC

Republican National Conventions
1956 United States presidential election
1956 in California
Republican Party (United States) events in California
1956 conferences
August 1956 events in the United States